Blind is a 2014 Norwegian drama film written and directed by Eskil Vogt. The film premiered in-competition in the World Cinema Dramatic Competition at 2014 Sundance Film Festival on 19 January. Vogt received the Screenwriting Award for Blind at Sundance. The film was later screened in the Panorama section of the 64th Berlin International Film Festival and was nominated for the 2014 Nordic Council Film Prize.

Plot
Forsaken in a brand-new apartment in Oslo, frail authoress Ingrid is trying to come to terms with losing her eyesight in mid-life. Fearful of venturing out on her own, Ingrid retreats into an elaborate fantasy bubble, on the verge of convincing herself that her architect husband is spying on her. A faint tapping or an unfamiliar sound are enough to incite her paranoia while reality and imagination begin to blur.

Cast
 Ellen Dorrit Petersen as Ingrid
  as Morten
 Vera Vitali as Elin

Reception
Blind received positive reviews upon its premiere at the 2014 Sundance Film Festival. Review aggregator Rotten Tomatoes reports a 92% positive score based on 37 reviews, with an average rating of 7.55/10. It also has a score of 83/100 on Metacritic based on 14 critics, indicating "universal acclaim".

Scott Foundas of Variety, said in his review that "ace Norwegian scribe Eskil Vogt makes a sparkling directorial debut with an alternately tragic and playful tale of a blind authoress". Boyd van Hoeij in his review for The Hollywood Reporter called the film "an ambitiously constructed screenplay translates into a film that's easier to admire than to love". William Bibbiani from CraveOnline praised the film by saying that "Blind exists as a nebulous construction, ever shifting but ultimately centered around a lovely and funny love-quadrangle with curious characters and consistent insight. The film's curious blend of the sensual and the cerebral manages to engage even when you begin to lack confidence about whether anything is actually happening at all".

Accolades

References

External links
 
 

2014 films
2014 drama films
Films about blind people
Norwegian drama films
2010s Norwegian-language films
Films directed by Eskil Vogt
Films with screenplays by Eskil Vogt
Sundance Film Festival award winners
Films set in Oslo